Zakia Wardak is an Afghan architect, politician, and businesswoman. She served as the first female Consul General of Afghanistan in Mumbai. Wardak is an advocate for inclusion and women's rights. She is from Kabul. Wardak has served as president of the Society of Afghan Women in Engineering and Construction. In 2018, she ran for a seat in the 2018 Afghan parliamentary election.

References

External links 

 

Living people
Year of birth missing (living people)
People from Kabul
21st-century Afghan women politicians
21st-century Afghan politicians
21st-century businesswomen
Afghan women in business
Afghan architects
Afghan women's rights activists
Afghan women activists
Afghan businesspeople